This is a list of Superfund sites in Delaware designated under the Comprehensive Environmental Response, Compensation, and Liability Act (CERCLA) environmental law.  The CERCLA federal law of 1980 authorized the United States Environmental Protection Agency (EPA) to create a list of polluted locations requiring a long-term response to clean up hazardous material contaminations.   These locations are known as Superfund sites, and are placed on the National Priorities List (NPL).

The NPL guides the EPA in "determining which sites warrant further investigation" for environmental remediation.  As of December 16, 2010, there were 14 Superfund sites on the National Priorities List in Delaware.  One additional site has been proposed for entry on the list.  Six sites have been cleaned up and removed from the list.

Superfund sites

See also
Fox Point State Park
List of Superfund sites in the United States
List of environmental issues
List of waste types
TOXMAP

External links
EPA list of proposed Superfund sites in Delaware
EPA list of current Superfund sites in Delaware
EPA list of Superfund site construction completions in Delaware
EPA list of partially deleted Superfund sites in Delaware
EPA list of deleted Superfund sites in Delaware

References

Delaware
Environment of Delaware
Superfund